Miss India USA is a beauty pageant for young women of Indian descent who are residents of the United States. The pageant was established in 1980 by the India Festival Committee headed by Dharmatma Saran. The winner of the Miss India USA pageant represents the United States at the Miss India Worldwide pageant.

The current titleholder of Miss India USA is Vaidehi Dongre from Michigan.

Titleholders

See also
 Indian Americans
 Indians in the New York City metropolitan region
 Miss India Connecticut

References

Beauty pageants in the United States
Indian-American culture
American awards
Beauty pageants for people of specific ethnic or national descents